Kovalevskaya is a prominent lunar impact crater that is located on the far side of the Moon. It lies to the southwest of the larger walled plain Landau. To the south of Kovalevskaya are the craters Poynting and Fersman.

This crater overlies nearly half of the large Kovalevskaya Q along the southwest rim. The outer rim of Kovalevskaya is generally well-formed and not significantly eroded. The inner walls have formed terraces and slumped shelves in places. At the midpoint of the interior floor is a pair of central peaks that are split down the middle by a valley running north–south. Some hills run to the east of these peaks, and there are some low hills near the northwest inner wall. The remainder of the floor is relatively level and free from significant impacts.

This feature was named after the Russian mathematician Sofia Kovalevskaya (1850–1891). The asteroid 1859 Kovalevskaya is also named in her honour.

Satellite craters 

By convention these features are identified on lunar maps by placing the letter on the side of the crater midpoint that is closest to Kovalevskaya.

References 

 
 
 
 
 
 
 
 
 
 
 
 

Impact craters on the Moon